Thomas Elwood Knotts (1861–1921) was the first mayor of the city of Gary, Indiana, serving from 1909 to 1913, after having previously served as head of the Gary town board from 1906 to 1909. He was also Gary's first postmaster.  His business ventures included the Gary Evening Post, later merged into the Gary Post-Tribune, and the Gary Trust & Savings Bank, both of which he founded in 1909.

Knotts was born in Highland County, Ohio in 1861, and subsequently graduated from Valparaiso University.  He was the brother of Armanis Knotts, an early mayor of Hammond, Indiana.  Prior to taking up the administration of Gary, he served as Superintendent of the Indian Schools in South Dakota during the presidency of Grover Cleveland, moving to Hammond in 1891, where he combined local entrepreneurship with various positions in the Hammond police department.

A Democrat and longtime supporter of organized labor, Knotts became a leading member of the "town forces" in a struggle against US Steel for political control of the city.  Knotts was defeated in the 1913 election by the company-backed Republican candidate, Roswell Johnson.

Knotts died on March 26, 1921 in Rochester, Minnesota, following surgery.

Works cited

References

1861 births
1921 deaths
People from Highland County, Ohio
Mayors of Gary, Indiana
Valparaiso University alumni